In music for bowed string instruments, or more precisely), is an instruction to strike the string with the stick of the bow across the strings.

History 

Sound 
The percussive sound of battuto has a clear pitch element determined by the distance of the bow from the bridge at the point of contact. As a group of players will never strike the string in exactly the same place, the sound of a section of violins playing  is dramatically different from the sound of a single violin doing so.

The wood of the bow can also be drawn across the string — a technique called  ("with the wood drawn"). This is much less common, and the plain marking  is invariably interpreted to mean battuto rather than tratto. If the sound is too quiet, the bow can be slightly rolled so that a few bow hairs touch the string as well, leading to a slightly less "airy" sound.

Equipment 
Some string players object to  playing as it can damage the bow; many players have a cheaper bow which they use for such passages, or for pieces which require extended passages. Some players tap the strings with pencils instead of bows, producing a further percussive, lighter sound.

References

Extended techniques
String performance techniques
Italian words and phrases

da:Col legno